Poinsettia: 亜麻色ウィンターメモリーズ (Poinsettia: Amairo Winter Memories, Flaxen Winter Memories) is Japanese pop singer Hitomi Shimatani's first mini-album. It bears a Christmas theme. It peaked at #5 on the Oricon charts and sold 88,706 copies altogether.

CD track listing
 こなゆき (Konayuki, Powder Snow)
 いつの日にか・・・ (Itsu No Hi Ni Ka..., Someday)
 Poinsettia
 マシュマロ (Marshmallow )
 恋人がサンタクロース (Koibito ga Santa Claus, Santa Claus Is My Sweetheart)
 Pearl & Snow
 亜麻色の髪の乙女 ～ウィンター・アカペラ・ヴァージョン～ (Amairo no Kami no Otome: Winter A cappella version, The Maiden with the Flaxen Hair)

Hitomi Shimatani albums
2002 EPs